Duppigheim is a commune in the Bas-Rhin department in Grand Est in north-eastern France. Duppigheim station has rail connections to Strasbourg and Molsheim.

Notable people
 Jean Bugatti died in a car accident in Duppigheim
 Arsène Wenger gave his name to the Stadium of Duppigheim

See also
 Communes of the Bas-Rhin department

References

Communes of Bas-Rhin
Bas-Rhin communes articles needing translation from French Wikipedia